Charles Billings may refer to:

 Charles E. Billings (1835–1920), American inventor
 Charles L. Billings (1856–1938), American lawyer and politician
 Charles W. Billings (1866–1928), American Olympic sport shooter
 Charles Billings (politician) (1825–1906), Canadian politician in Gloucester Township, Ontario